Marmagne may refer to:

 Marmagne, Cher, France
 Marmagne, Côte-d'Or, France
 Marmagne, Saône-et-Loire, France